Thomas Overton (1753–1824) was an American military and political leader best known for having been the second to Andrew Jackson in his duel with Charles Dickinson in 1806.

Thomas Overton was born in Louisa County, Virginia in 1753. His parents were James Overton and Mary Waller; his father was a great-grandson of Robert Overton, the Parliamentarian military commander during the English Civil War (and friend of Marvell and Milton).

He served throughout the Revolutionary War in the Continental Army, and was an original member of the Society of the Cincinnati in Virginia.

He was first appointed 2nd Lieutenant in the 9th Virginia Regiment in 1776 and was promoted to 1st Lieutenant in 1778. He was transferred to the 1st Virginia Regiment on March 14, 1778 and was made a Lieutenant, adjutant of the 4th Continental Dragoons on July 1, 1779. He was made a Captain on April 24, 1781.

He married Sarah Woodson in 1787 and Penelope Holmes (a sister of Gabriel Holmes) in 1795. His daughter Jane (by his first wife) was the mother of Thomas Overton Moore, Governor of Louisiana from 1860 to 1864. His son (by his first wife) Walter Hampden Overton was elected to the United States House of Representatives in 1828.

He spent a number of years in mid-life in North Carolina (where he represented Moore County in the State Legislature, which made him a Brigadier General), and in about 1804 moved to Tennessee where he died in 1824.

His younger brother John (of Travellers Rest) was among Jackson's closest friends and was the founder of the city of Memphis.

References

Read more
 Lineage Book - National Society of the Daughters of the American Revolution Volumes 59-60

External links 
 
 Historical Marker for General Thomas Overton
 The Duel Between Andrew Jackson and Charles Dickinson
 Find A Grave-Thomas Overton
 Society of the Cincinnati
 American Revolution Institute

1753 births
1824 deaths
People from Louisa County, Virginia
American people of English descent
Continental Army officers from Virginia
Dueling